Robert Joe Cox (born May 21, 1941) is an American former professional baseball third baseman and manager in Major League Baseball (MLB). Cox played for the New York Yankees and managed the Atlanta Braves and Toronto Blue Jays. He is a member of the National Baseball Hall of Fame. He recorded a 100-win season six times, a record matched only by Joe McCarthy.

Cox first managed the Braves from 1978 to 1981, and then managed the Blue Jays from 1982 to 1985. He rejoined the Braves in 1986 as a general manager. He moved back to the manager's role during the 1990 season and stayed there until his retirement following the 2010 season. The Braves have since retired No. 6 in his honor. Cox holds the all-time record for ejections in MLB with 158 (plus an additional three post-season ejections), a record previously held by John McGraw. He also leads the league in playoff appearances as manager with sixteen, and he was the first since Casey Stengel to have qualified for the postseason ten times (four managers have since followed him). He became the first manager to exceed three consecutive appearances in the League Championship Series, doing so by qualifying for the National League Championship Series from 1991 to 1999 (excluding 1994, which had no NLCS).

Playing career
As a player, Cox originally signed with the Los Angeles Dodgers, but was never able to make the Dodgers' major league team. Eventually he was acquired by the Braves, but never appeared in an MLB game for them either. Instead, he was traded to the New York Yankees on December 7, 1967. Cox played two seasons, mostly at third base, for the Yankees.

Managerial career

Prior to managing
Prior to managing in the States, Cox played from 1967 to 1970 for the Cardenales de Lara and Leones del Caracas clubs of the Venezuelan Winter League. He later managed the Cardenales during three consecutive seasons from 1974–75 through 1976–77. In between, he coached and managed in the Yankees minor league system.

New York Yankees farm system
Cox began his managerial career in the Yankees farm system in 1971. In 1976, he led the Syracuse Chiefs to the International League's Governors' Cup title. This team featured such future major leaguers as Ron Guidry, Mickey Klutts, Terry Whitfield and Juan Bernhardt. Overall, Cox had a highly successful six-year tenure as a minor league manager, compiling a record of 459 wins and 387 defeats (.543) with two league championships. He then spent the 1977 season as the first base coach on Billy Martin's staff with the World Series–winning Yankees before beginning his MLB managerial career.

Atlanta Braves (1978–1981)
Cox replaced Dave Bristol as the manager of the Atlanta Braves prior to the 1978 season, inheriting a team that had finished last in the National League West during the previous two seasons and, in 1977, compiled a worse record than the first-year Seattle Mariners of the American League. Building from the ground up, the Braves finished last in both 1978 and 1979. Entering 1980, Cox made one of the unusual moves for which he is known, moving power-hitting first baseman–catcher Dale Murphy, who had developed a throwing block as a catcher that hindered his ability to play, to center field. Murphy later won two National League Most Valuable Player Awards and five Gold Gloves, and became one of the premier players of the 1980s. In 1980, the Braves finished fourth with their first record above .500 since 1974. However, Cox was undone by the 1981 baseball strike when the Braves finished fifth and owner Ted Turner fired him. Asked at a press conference who was on his short list for manager, Turner replied, "It would be Bobby Cox if I hadn't just fired him. We need someone like him around here." The Braves won the National League West division title in 1982 and finished second in both 1983 and 1984 under Cox's successor Joe Torre. Cox finished with a record of 266 wins and 323 losses in the regular season.

Toronto Blue Jays (1982–1985)
Cox joined the Toronto Blue Jays in 1982, who steadily improved over the four years of his management. Cito Gaston was brought in as a coach for the team because of Cox, and Gaston would be named manager of the Jays years later. In 1985, Cox's fourth season with the club, the Blue Jays finished in first place in the American League East. That season, the American League Championship Series was expanded to a best-of-seven format after 16 seasons of a best-of-five format. This change ultimately made the difference when Cox's Blue Jays became only the fifth team to lose a playoff series after leading three games to one to the Kansas City Royals, with the decision by Dick Howser to counter Cox's platooning by starting a right-handed pitcher before going with left-handed relievers in the middle innings proving key. He finished his stint as manager with a record of 355 wins and 292 losses for his regular season record. Cox left to return to Atlanta as a general manager, and he was replaced in Toronto by Jimy Williams.

Second stint with the Atlanta Braves (1986–2010)

General manager
After the Blue Jays' elimination, Cox returned to the Braves as general manager. After going through two managers over the course of less than five years with disastrous results in attendance and outlook, Cox fired Russ Nixon in June 1990 and named himself field manager. Cox had spent the prior four seasons accumulating talented players, including Tom Glavine, Steve Avery, John Smoltz, Ron Gant, and David Justice. He was also responsible for drafting Chipper Jones with the first overall pick in the 1990 draft. After the season, he handed the general manager's post to Kansas City Royals general manager John Schuerholz.

1991
In 1991, the Braves, along with the Minnesota Twins, became the first teams to go from last place to first place from one year to the next. The two teams met in the 1991 World Series, which the Twins won in seven games. It was the second World Series in which the home team won every game. The first was in 1987 when the Twins defeated the St. Louis Cardinals in seven games.

1992–93
In 1992, Cox's Braves held a 3–1 lead in the National League Championship Series against the Pittsburgh Pirates before losing Games 5 and 6, although they did win Game 7 on Francisco Cabrera's ninth-inning, two-out, pinch-hit, two-run single. They went on to lose the World Series to his former club the Toronto Blue Jays. In 1993, the Braves had the best record in baseball after a pennant race where they overcame a ten-game deficit in August to beat the San Francisco Giants. By going 51–17 over the last two and a half months of the season, they won the division by a game. However, they lost the National League Championship Series in six games to the Philadelphia Phillies.

1995–96
In 1995, the Atlanta Braves won Cox's only World Series championship as a manager, over the Cleveland Indians. Their division title in 1995 marked the first time since 1989 that neither Pennsylvania team won the National League East.

In May 1995, Cox was arrested on simple battery charge after his wife called police and alleged Cox struck her. She retracted the statement the following day, and the charges were dropped after the couple attended court-ordered counseling.

In 1996, the Braves again won the division title. After sweeping the Los Angeles Dodgers in the division series, the Braves' pitching fell behind the St. Louis Cardinals, three games to one in the 1996. Facing elimination, the Braves offense outscored the Cardinals 33–1 over the final three games and won the pennant. Cox became the only manager in history to lose a series leading three games to one and win a series trailing three games to one. The scoring continued into the first two games against the New York Yankees as the Braves took a two games to none lead by winning with scores of 12–1 and 4–0 in the World Series. In game four, the Braves led 6–0 in the fourth inning, but the Yankees came from behind. Jim Leyritz homered to tie the game, and the Yankees tied the series with a win in 11 innings, 8–6.  The Yankees would ultimately win in six games. Cox was ejected in Game 6; he was the most recent person to be ejected in a World Series game until Dave Martinez in 2019 in Game 6 against the Houston Astros.

1997–2001
The Braves lost to the Florida Marlins in the 1997 NLCS and the San Diego Padres in the 1998 NLCS. The Braves made it back to the World Series in 1999, but lost to the defending World Series Champion New York Yankees in four straight games. Cox's 2001 team won the division title and upset the favored Houston Astros in three straight games in the division series. However, the Arizona Diamondbacks defeated the Braves in five games in the NLCS.

One of Cox's memorable games as manager of the Braves during this period came on September 21, 2001, when they played rival New York Mets in the first major professional sporting event played in New York City since the 9/11 attacks.

In 2001, he tied a record held by John McGraw, Bill Dahlen and Paul Richards by being ejected from eleven games in a single season.

2002–2010
Cox's Braves did not advance past the first round of the playoffs in any of their last five appearances. In 2002, the Braves won 101 games and led the wild card San Francisco Giants 2 games to 1 before dropping the last two. In 2003, the Braves pushed the Chicago Cubs to the fifth game before falling. The following year, the Braves lost in the best-of-five Division Series for the third straight year. In 2005, the Braves lost to the Houston Astros, with the finale taking 18 innings to decide in the 2005 NLDS. On September 23, 2009, Cox signed a one-year contract extension through 2010, and on the same day announced that 2010 would be his final year as manager. He also announced that he agreed to stay on as an advisor for team baseball operations for the next five years after he retires. On October 2, 2010, the Atlanta Braves honored Bobby Cox at Turner Field in a sold-out game. On October 3, 2010, Cox led the Braves to an 8–7 win over the Phillies and clinched both his and the Braves' first wild card. His final game was on October 11, 2010, when the Braves were eliminated by the San Francisco Giants in Game 4 of the National League Division Series. He was given a standing ovation by the crowd and both teams immediately following the game. He finished with a record of 1,883 wins and 1,386 losses in the regular season and 64 wins and 65 losses in the post-season. His record from both stints as manager is 2,149 wins and 1,709 losses for a .557 winning percentage in 3,858 games. His overall managerial record is 2,504 wins and 2,001 losses in the regular season and 67 wins and 69 losses in the post-season.

Managerial record

Personal life
Bobby Cox is married to Pamela and has eight children.

One day after participating in the Braves home opening day (April 1, 2019) festivities Cox was hospitalized after suffering a stroke. Five months after his stroke, Cox made a visit to SunTrust Park on September 2, 2019 to watch the Braves play the Toronto Blue Jays, a game which the Braves won 6–3. As a result of the stroke Cox suffers from paralysis in his right arm which requires it to be in a sling.

Accomplishments

Cox has been named Manager of the Year four times (1985, 1991, 2004, 2005) and is one of only four managers to have won the award in both the American and National League. He and Kevin Cash are the only managers to have won the award in consecutive years. Cox has also been named Manager of the Year by The Sporting News eight times (1985, 1991, 1993, 1999, 2002, 2003, 2004, and 2005).

On May 12, 2007, Cox passed Sparky Anderson to become the fourth-winningest manager in major league history, with a record of 2,195 wins and 1,698 losses. He led the Braves to a division title every season from 1991 to 2005, excluding the strike-shortened 1994 season; the Braves have competed in the National League East since 1994 and competed in the National League West prior to that. He won a World Series Championship in 1995. In 2001, he took sole possession of first place for most wins as a manager in Braves history. Cox's .561 winning percentage is fourteenth in all-time among managers with at least 1,000 games managed, and is the second highest among those who managed the majority of their career after the creation of divisions within each league in 1969. On June 8, 2009, Cox won his 2,000th game with the Atlanta Braves, becoming only the fourth manager in Major League history to accomplish that feat with one team. Cox reached career win number 2,500 on September 25, 2010, becoming only the fourth manager in Major League history to do so.

On September 17, 2010, Cox was ejected for the 158th time in his Major League coaching career during the second inning of a Braves game against the New York Mets; he currently holds the all-time record for most ejections (set on August 14, 2007 with his 132nd), previously held by John McGraw. By a strange twist of fate, his first ejection happened while managing of the Braves in a game against the Mets on May 1, 1978. Unlike McGraw, Cox did not have a reputation for having a fiery temper and Cox generally only got ejected to prevent his players from being ejected. In the 156 games from which Cox was ejected, his teams had a winning percentage of .385. In a July 2006 game, Cox was unable to save outfielder Jeff Francoeur from ejection; speaking with Atlanta Journal-Constitution beat writer David O'Brien, Francoeur recounted his manager's advice after both men had been sent to the Braves clubhouse:
"I’m like, ‘What do I do?’ He said, ‘Go have a couple cold beers and get in the cold tub or something and relax. And then you’ll probably have to write a $500 check. Or you can do what I do, write a $10,000 one and tell them when it runs out, let me know'."

Cox is also the only person among all players and managers to be ejected from two World Series games ( and ). He was ejected in the ninth inning of Game 3 of the 1992 World Series for throwing a batting helmet onto the field at the SkyDome. Cox was trying to slam the helmet against the lip of the dugout and missed, throwing it onto the field. Cox was tossed again in the final game of the 1996 World Series after protesting an out call of Marquis Grissom attempting to take second base on a passed ball. Although video replays appeared to show Grissom was safe, umpire Terry Tata called him out, and Cox was tossed in the ensuing argument.

In 1981, Cox was inducted into the Fresno County Athletic Hall of Fame.

On August 12, 2011 a luncheon was held by the Braves, and Cox was inducted into the Atlanta Braves Hall of Fame and his number six jersey was retired. Afterward, an on-field ceremony was held that recognized the long-time Braves manager prior to the scheduled game versus the Chicago Cubs.

Cox was unanimously elected to the Baseball Hall of Fame by the 16-member Veterans Committee on December 9, 2013. The ceremony was held on July 27, 2014.

Cox was hired on September 22, 2014 to return on a part-time basis to help the Atlanta Braves choose their next General Manager and Director of Player Development after the dismissal of General Manager Frank Wren and Player Personnel Director Bruce Manno.

In 2019, the International League announced that Cox would be inducted into its Hall of Fame, noting especially his managerial experience with the Chiefs.

See also

 List of Major League Baseball managers by wins

References

External links

1941 births
Living people
Albuquerque Dukes players
American expatriate baseball people in Canada
Atlanta Braves executives
Atlanta Braves managers
Atlanta Braves scouts
Austin Braves players
Baseball players from Oklahoma
Cardenales de Lara players
Fort Lauderdale Yankees managers
Fort Lauderdale Yankees players
Great Falls Electrics players
Leones del Caracas players
American expatriate baseball players in Venezuela
Major League Baseball first base coaches
Major League Baseball general managers
Major League Baseball managers with retired numbers
Manager of the Year Award winners
National Baseball Hall of Fame inductees
New York Yankees coaches
New York Yankees players
Panama City Fliers players
Reno Silver Sox players
Richmond Braves players
Salem Dodgers players
Salt Lake City Bees players
Sportspeople from Tulsa, Oklahoma
Syracuse Chiefs managers
Tacoma Cubs players
Toronto Blue Jays managers
People from Adairsville, Georgia
Sportspeople from the Atlanta metropolitan area
World Series-winning managers